Pandemis piceocola is a species of moth of the family Tortricidae. It is found in China (Gansu).

The length of the forewings is about 8 mm for males and 10 mm for females.

The larvae feed on Picea crassifolia.

References

	

Moths described in 1990
Pandemis